In medicine, a sound, also called a sonde, is an instrument for probing and dilating passages within the body, the best-known examples of which are urethral sounds and uterine sounds.

Urethral sounds

Urethral sounds are designed to be inserted into the male or female urethra, for the purpose of stretching or unblocking a stricture. There are a number of different types of urethral sounds:
 Bakes sounds, also known as rosebud or bullet sounds, have a long thin metal rod with a bulbous bud on the end.
 Dittel sounds have a flat end and a rounded end.
 Hank sounds have a more pronounced curve at the ends, as well as a metal rib on each end.
 Pratt sounds are longer urethral dilators (double ended ones are usually almost a foot long) with rounded and slightly bent ends.
 Van Buren sounds have very pronounced tips and applicators

Uterine sounds

These sounds are intended for probing a woman's uterus through the cervix, to measure the length and direction of the cervical canal and uterus. Dilators are primarily used to open and dilate the cervix to gain access to the uterine cavity, but can also be used as sounds.

Uterine sounding may be performed prior to embryo transfer to determine the uterine depth and how easily an embryo transfer catheter can be passed through the cervix. In this case, it may also be called a trial transfer.
It is performed prior to insertion of an intrauterine device (IUD) in order to measure the length and direction of the cervical canal and uterus. This reduces the risk of perforating the uterus with the IUD. This may occur when the IUD is inserted too deeply or at the wrong angle.

Different types of Uterine sounds include the following:
 Hegar dilators have two rounded ends, are fairly short, and are mildly curved in shape.
 Sims sounds have a flat end and a rounded end.

See also
 Anal probe

Notes

References

External links
 INSTRUCTIONS FOR SOUNDING THE UTERUS

Medical equipment